The 1951 Colgate Red Raiders football team was an American football team that represented Colgate University as an independent during the 1951 college football season. In its fifth and final season under head coach Paul Bixler, the team compiled a 4–5 record and was outscored by a total of 187 to 184. William Owens was the team captain. The team played its home games at Colgate Athletic Field in Hamilton, New York.

Schedule

References

Colgate
Colgate Raiders football seasons
Colgate Red Raiders football